Larissa FastHorse is a Native American (Sicangu Lakota) playwright and choreographer based in Santa Monica, California. FastHorse grew up in South Dakota, where she began her career as a ballet dancer and choreographer but was forced into an early retirement after ten years of dancing due to an injury. Returning to an early interest in writing, she became involved in Native American drama, especially the Native American film community. Later she began writing and directing her own plays, several of which are published through Samuel French (a Concord Theatricals Company) and Dramatic Publishing. With playwright and performer Ty Defoe, FastHorse co-founded Indigenous Direction, a "consulting firm that helps organizations and individuals who want to create accurate work by, for and with Indigenous peoples." Indigenous Direction's clients include the Guthrie Theater. FastHorse is a past vice chair of the Theatre Communications Group, a service organization for professional non-profit American theatre.

Career 
In 2000, FastHorse was a delegate to the United Nations in Geneva, where she spoke on the impact cinema can have for Indigenous peoples. FastHorse then shifted from a career as a dancer and choreographer, to feature television and film development.

FastHorse worked for Universal Pictures before joining Latham Entertainment at Paramount as a creative executive. She produced two short films, The Migration and A Final Wish, before switching her focus to writing and directing.

While writing and working on many projects of her own making, FastHorse also served as a panelist for The Film and Video Fellowships, formerly named the Rockefeller Fellowship. She has been involved with many other networks and theatre companies, having written commissioned pieces for the AlterTheater in San Rafael, CA; Cornerstone Theatre Company; and Native Voices at the Autry both located in Los Angeles, CA, as well as the Children's Theatre Company in Minneapolis, MN; the Kennedy Center for Young Audiences in Washington, D.C.; and for Mountainside Theater in Cherokee, N.C. She has developed new plays with the Arizona Theatre Company, Tucson, AZ; the Center Theatre Group Writer's Workshop, Los Angeles, CA; and Berkeley Rep's Ground Floor, Berkeley, CA. Her play Urban Rez, created with Cornerstone Theater, portrays the experience of Indigenous people in Los Angeles County, home to the U.S.'s second-largest Indigenous population. The Thanksgiving Play was begun with a fellowship from the Guthrie Theater and developed through readings including at DC's Center Stage Play Lab in 2016; it was produced by Artists Repertory Theatre in Oregon in April 2018. Both The Thanksgiving Play in 2017 and What Would Crazy Horse Do? in 2014 were featured on the annual "Kilroys' List" of "recommended un- and underproduced new plays by female and trans authors of color." What Would Crazy Horse Do?, a comedy inspired by historical interest by the KKK in collaborations with Indigenous groups, was featured in the Lilly Awards' 2015 reading series with performers Emily Bergl, Jesse Perez, and Madeline Sayet. The Thanksgiving Play also secured FastHorse's off-Broadway playwright debut, with an October 2018 production announced by Playwrights Horizons, directed by Moritz von Stuelpnagel and starring Margo Seibert, Jennifer Bareilles, Jeffrey Bean, and Greg Keller.

FastHorse currently serves as Vice Chairman of Playwrights Horizons.

As part of her production contract as a playwright, FastHorse requires that the theatre hire at least one other Indigenous artist for the production, and showcase at least one other Indigenous artist's work in the building.

Honors and awards
 MacArthur Fellows Program, Class of 2020
 FastHorse completed a 2006 fellowship from Fox Diversity Writer's Initiative Programs
 recipient of the 2015-2016 Joe Dowling Annaghmakerig Fellowship Award
 National Endowment for the Arts Distinguished New Play Development Grant
 AATE Distinguished Play Award
 William Inge Center for the Arts Playwriting Residency
 Sundance Institute-Ford Foundation Fellowship
 Aurand Harris Fellowship
 member of the Center Theatre Group Writer's Workshop in 2011-2012 
 Two for New Works grant recipient
 National Geographic Seed Grant 
PEN/USA Literary Award for Drama
 Delegate to the UN in Geneva
Center Stage's Wright Now, Play Later Project, 2016

Television credits 
 The Line (pilot; Fox)
 Lakota Falls (pilot; Teen Nick)

Theatre credits

Choreography
 Unto These Hills, Cherokee, NC, 2008-2011

Writing
 Meeting Mom is an original short story about FastHorse's feelings after meeting her birthmother for the first time.
 Average Family was a piece commissioned by the Children's Theater Company.
 Fancy Dancer was also based on FastHorse's life, won FastHorse the 2010 National Endowment for the Arts Distinguishing New Play Development Grant. It was not directed by FastHorse, however, but instead by Peter Brosius.
 Lazarus Rises was able to run a staged reading funded by the Sundance Institute/ Ford Foundation Fellowship and Grant. Lazarus Rises is an autobiographical metaphor that follows three differently disabled Native Americans veterans as they adventure across the state of South Dakota. Surprisingly enough, the blind man is behind the wheel.
 Urban Rez is a community-engaged production that was created by FastHorse in collaboration with members of the Native American community of Los Angeles.
 Teaching Disco Square Dancing to Our Elders: A Class Presentation was the first of three commission with the Native Voices at the Autry in Los Angeles.
 Cherokee Family Reunion  premiered in July 2012 in association with the Cherokee Historical Association.
 A Dancing People was commissioned by the Kennedy Center Theatre for Young Audiences. The play brings together writing backgrounds as well as dance to blend together spoken words and dancing movements.
 Hunka  was invited to be a part of the Arizona Theatre Company's Inaugural Cafe Bohemia season.
Landless Commissioned and produced by AlterTheater 
The Thanksgiving Play
What Would Crazy Horse Do?
Native Nation
Cow Pie Bingo Commissioned and produced by AlterTheater 2018

Personal 
FastHorse is a member of the Rosebud Sioux Tribe of the Lakota people. She lives with husband, sculptor Edd Hogan, in Santa Monica.

References

External links 
 About Page on Website
 Indigenous Direction Website

Native American dramatists and playwrights
21st-century American dramatists and playwrights
Lakota people
Brulé people
Writers from South Dakota
Writers from Santa Monica, California
Native American women writers
21st-century American women writers
American women dramatists and playwrights
MacArthur Fellows